The Yale Bulldogs women's hockey team will represent Yale University in the 2010–11 NCAA Division I women's ice hockey season.

Offseason
June 7: Head coach Hilary Witt will leave the program at the end of June. Witt coached the Bulldogs for eight seasons and is the program's most victorious coach, accumulating 96 wins during her tenure.
June 7: Mandi Schwartz was recently diagnosed for a second time with acute myeloid leukemia. Because of the relapse, Schwartz will require a cord-blood or blood-marrow donor to survive. She has been enrolled in an experimental drug testing program near her home. She died in April 2011.
July 28: The Bulldogs have hired Joakim Flygh to be the new head coach of the Bulldogs. Flygh coached over the last nine years at Harvard (as an assistant to Katey Stone, Minnesota-Duluth (as an assistant to Shannon Miller and at a New England College men's team. This will be Flygh's first head coaching position.
September 27: Former Minnesota Duluth player Jessica Koizumi has joined the Bulldogs as an assistant coach. She was part of the 2008 United States national women's team that won the 2008 Women's World Ice Hockey Championships.

Recruiting

Exhibition

News and notes
In February 2011, the passing of Daron Richardson inspired the Yale Bulldogs to raise awareness of youth mental health issues. Freshman forward Jenna Ciotti played with Daron's sister, Morgan on the Ottawa Senators of the PWHL. In addition, Ciotti was also coached by Daron's father, Luke Richardson. The Bulldogs’ support for the Do It For Daron charity was symbolized by the purple wristbands the club wore during the month of February and March in the 2010–11 Yale Bulldogs women's ice hockey season. She played on the PWHL Senators with Morgan Richardson (under Luke Richardson's coaching) for two seasons. Ciotti wanted the bracelets to keep Daron's spirit alive and support the Richardson family.
April 3: Mandi Schwartz succumbs to recurrent acute myeloid leukemia at age 23.
April 22: The Yale Bulldogs introduced the Mandi Schwartz Award. The award is given in acknowledgement of a Yale Bulldog player's courage, grit and determination. Aleca Hughes was named as the first winner of the award.
April 22: Aleca Hughes was elected team captain for the 2011–12 Yale Bulldogs women's ice hockey season.

Regular season

Standings

Schedule

Conference record

Player stats

Awards and honors
Jenna Ciotti, Hockey East Player of the Week (Week of February 8, 2011)
Jenna Ciotti, Hockey East Rookie of the Week (Week of February 8, 2011)
Aleca Hughes, 2011 Hockey Humanitarian Award finalist
Jackee Snikeris, MLX Skates Goaltender of the Week (Week of November 30, 2010)
Jackee Snikeris, 2011 Patty Kazmaier Award Nominee
Jackee Snikeris, 2010-11 ECAC Goaltender of the Year
Jackee Snikeris, 2010-11 Women's Student-Athlete of the Year
Jackee Snikeris, New England Hockey Writers' Association Division I All-Star Team

Jackee Snikeris, 2011 Sarah Devens Award

See also
2009–10 Yale Bulldogs women's ice hockey season

References

External links
Official site

Y
Y
Yale Bulldogs women's ice hockey seasons
Yale Bulldogs
Yale Bulldogs